Hutsonville Township is one of ten townships in Crawford County, Illinois, USA.  As of the 2010 census, its population was 1,177 and it contained 550 housing units.

Geography
The Wabash River defines its eastern border.

Cities, towns, villages
 Hutsonville

Unincorporated towns
 West York

Cemeteries
The township contains these eight cemeteries: Ball, Bradbury, Draper, Guyer, Hutson Old, Hutsonville New, Lindley and Musgrave.

Major highways
  Illinois Route 1

Demographics

School districts
 Hutsonville Community Unit School District 1
 Palestine Community Unit School District 3
 Robinson Community Unit School District 2

Political districts
 Illinois' 15th congressional district
 State House District 109
 State Senate District 55

References

 United States Census Bureau 2007 TIGER/Line Shapefiles
 United States National Atlas

External links
 City-Data.com
 Illinois State Archives

Townships in Crawford County, Illinois
Townships in Illinois